Mike Lè Han is an English screenwriter and film director who has worked in television and on short films. He has a background in post production and visual effects. He lives in Los Angeles, California.

Career
Lè Han directed many outside broadcast, drama and docudrama productions between 1997 and 2009. His work was nominated for two RTS Awards in 2009 when he directed The Great Train Robbery and Crimes That Shook Britain for Manchester-based production company Title Role. Le Han has also directed several high-profile commercials for varying car manufactures.

In 2010 Lè Han co-wrote with wife Helen Lè Han Mrs Peppercorn's Magical Reading Room and completed filming in May of the same year. The trailer for the film won Best Trailer for an un-produced movie at the International Movie Trailer Festival in Los Angeles. The finished short with crime-novelist Martina Cole functioning as executive producer premiered March 2011 to an invite-only audience at BAFTA in London and is being reworked into a feature.

In January 2011, Lè Han was featured as a director to watch in MovieScope Magazine and then in the April edition of Variety in the UK and USA.

In August 2011 Mrs Peppercorn's Magical Reading Room won Best Short Film by unanimous vote at the prestigious HollyShorts Film Festival in Los Angeles. In the same month at the request of Disney Animation Studios, he screened the film to executives and creatives at their Burbank facilities. In December 2011 it won Best Short Fiction Film at the Olympia International Film Festival in Greece.

On Halloween Lè Han released online a trailer to accompany a pitch to reboot the Hellraiser franchise. The video went viral.

Awards

Filmography
Director Credits

Second Unit Director

Producer Credits

Writer Credits

References

External links
 Official Website: Mrs Peppercorn's Magical Reading Room
 

English film directors
English screenwriters
English male screenwriters
1972 births
Living people
People from Marston Green